Halo is a science fiction video game franchise created by Bungie and owned and published by Microsoft Studios. Central to the Halo series are the three first-person shooter video games Halo: Combat Evolved, Halo 2 and Halo 3; novelizations, soundtracks, and other media are also available. The story of the series is about the Master Chief, a cybernetically enhanced human super-soldier and his artificial intelligence (AI) companion, Cortana, as the humans of a futuristic universe battle the Covenant, a theocratic alliance of alien races. The Halo series has inspired machinima productions, such as Red vs. Blue, and other fan fiction; however, this list only covers media produced or endorsed by series creator Bungie, or the intellectual property overseer 343 Industries.

The Halo video games have been highly successful and influential; the first game was labeled the killer application of Microsoft's Xbox and was credited with selling many consoles. Halo: Combat Evolved is also noted for its intuitive control scheme that has been used by many console first person shooters since. Halo 2 sold 2.4 million copies making US$125 million in the first 24 hours after its release beating the record for highest grossing entertainment release. Halo 3 grossed US$170 million on its first day, $45 million more than its predecessor. Halo 2 and Halo 3 are also the best selling titles of their respective consoles, the Xbox and the Xbox 360.

Games

Video games

Other games

Soundtracks

Printed media

Novels

Comic books

Other books

Other media

See also 
 Xbox Game Studios

References

External links 
 Official Bungie site
 Official Microsoft Game Studios site

Media
Halo
Halo